HD 30432, also known as HR 1526, is a solitary, orange hued star located in the southern constellation of Caelum, the chisel. It has an apparent magnitude of 6.04, making it faintly visible to the naked eye if viewed under ideal conditions. Based on parallax measurements from the Gaia spacecraft, the object is estimated to be 310 light years distant. Eggen (1993) lists it as a member of the old disk population.

HD 30432 has a stellar classification of K1 III, indicating that it is an evolved giant star. It is currently on the red giant branch, fusing a hydrogen shell around an inert helium core. It has 2.8 times the mass of the Sun and is estimated to be 455 million years old. Despite the low temperature, HD 30432 shines with a luminosity 39 times that of the Sun from its photosphere. It has a metallicity 16% below solar levels, making it slightly metal deficient.

References

K-type giants
High-proper-motion stars
Caelum
Caeli, 15
030432
022144
1526
CD-39 01624